A stew pond or stew is a fish pond used to store live fish ready for eating.

During the Middle Ages, stews were often attached to monasteries, to supply fish over the winter.

References

 Woolrych, Humphry William (1853) A treatise of the law of waters p. 133, T & J W Johnson.

See also
 Ancient Hawaiian aquaculture

Hydrology
Fish ponds